Black Feeling! is an album by jazz organist Johnny "Hammond" Smith recorded for the Prestige label in 1969.

Reception

The Allmusic site awarded the album 3 stars stating "Without varying his basic template that much, Smith did employ a much fuller combo for Black Feeling!".

Track listing
All compositions by Johnny "Hammond" Smith except where noted.
 "Black Feeling" (Leo Johnson) – 6:30
 "Kindra" (Johnson) – 5:40
 "Johnny Hammond Boogaloo" (Wally Richardson) – 5:00
 "Dig On It" (Johnson) – 7:55
 "When Sunny Gets Blue" (Marvin Fisher, Jack Segal) – 4:25
 "Soul Talk-1970" – 6:20

Personnel
Johnny "Hammond" Smith – organ
Virgil Jones – trumpet
Rusty Bryant, Leo Johnson – tenor saxophone
Wally Richardson – guitar
Jimmy Lewis – electric bass
Bernard Purdie – drums

Production
 Bob Porter – producer
 Rudy Van Gelder – engineer

References

Johnny "Hammond" Smith albums
1970 albums
Prestige Records albums
Albums produced by Bob Porter (record producer)
Albums recorded at Van Gelder Studio